Krobia may refer to:

Places
Krobia in Greater Poland Voivodeship (west-central Poland)
Krobia, Kuyavian-Pomeranian Voivodeship (north-central Poland)
Krobia, Masovian Voivodeship (east-central Poland)

Biology
 Krobia – a genus of cichlid fish from South America